David Parker (born 1947 in Brisbane, Queensland) is an Australian cinematographer, film producer, screenwriter, and film director.

Films written by Parker include Malcolm, Rikky and Pete, The Big Steal, Amy, and Matching Jack (with Lynne Renew). Parker won the AFI Best Screenplay awards for Malcolm and The Big Steal.  

Films produced by Parker include Malcolm, The Big Steal, Rikky and Pete, Hotel de Love, Irresistible, 'Amy, Matching Jack, and The Gates of Hell. He also produced Stark - (a BBC mini-series written by Ben Elton) and Fatal Honeymoon (for Lifetime TV in 2013). Parker co-produced the film Kath and Kimderella. 

He has directed three films, Hercules Returns, Diana & Me and The Menkoff Method. He directed television commercials in the 90's notably - the "I'd Like To See That" AFL Campaign, Motorola, Nike, and Vodafone with Michael Richards. Hercules Returns was invited to both Venice and Sundance Film Festivals in 1994. 

Films shot by Parker include Malcolm, Rikky and Pete (United Artists), The Big Steal, Pure Luck (Universal), Amy (Village Roadshow), Mr. Reliable (Polygram), Matching Jack, John Doe, Kath and Kimderella, (Village Roadshow). Parker's TV cinematography includes The Outsiders (Francis Ford Coppola's offshoot series of the movie, Stark (BBC), Felicity, Samantha, The Miracle Worker (Disney, 2000), Child Star (Disney, 2001), Custody, Catalina Trust, Lea to the Rescue, and Fatal Honeymoon. 

He is married to director Nadia Tass, and together they established Cascade Films in 1983, a Melbourne-based production company which has produced a series of acclaimed feature films and high-quality television. Parker and Ms Tass also owned and operated the Melbourne Film Studios in Port Melbourne from 1989 until 2009; many internationally successful films and TV series were shot in these studios prior to the Docklands Studios Melbourne opening in 2004.

In 1986, Parker and Tass also won the Byron Kennedy Award for their "fiercely independent approach to film making".

Parker served as a Commissioner on the Australian Film Commission from 1992 to 1995, and was also a board member of Film Victoria from 2010 to 2018.

References

External links

David Parker at Cascade Films

Australian screenwriters
Australian film directors
Australian cinematographers
Australian film producers
Living people
1947 births